This is a list of the municipalities in the province and autonomous community of Madrid, Spain.

See also

List of cities in Spain

 
Madrid
Municipalities